Pygmaepterys germainae is a species of sea snail, a marine gastropod mollusk in the family Muricidae, the murex snails or rock snails.

Distribution
This marine species occurs off Puerto Rico and Martinique.

References

 Vokes E.H. & D'Attilio A. (1980). Pygmaepterys, a newly described taxon of Muricidae (Mollusca: Gastropoda), with the description of three new species from the Cenozoic of the Western Atlantic. Tulane Studies in Geology and Paleontology. 16: 45-54, 2 pls.
 Espinosa J. & Ortea J. (2017). Dos nuevas especies de la familia Muricidae Rafinesque, 1815 (Mollusca: Neogastropoda) de la isla de Martinica, Antillas Menores. Avicennia. 20: 41-44.
 Garrigues B. & Lamy D. (2019). Inventaire des Muricidae récoltés au cours de la campagne MADIBENTHOS du MNHN en Martinique (Antilles Françaises) et description de 12 nouvelles espèces des genres Dermomurex, Attilosa, Acanthotrophon, Favartia, Muricopsis et Pygmaepterys (Mollusca, Gastropoda). Xenophora Taxonomy. 23: 22-59.

Muricidae
Gastropods described in 1980